Hans Robert Fritz Hahn (14 April 1914 – 18 December 1982) who was nicknamed "Assi" was a German Luftwaffe military aviator during World War II, a fighter ace credited with 108 enemy aircraft shot down in 560 combat missions. He claimed 66 victories over the Western Front, of which 53 were Supermarine Spitfires. Of the 42 victories he recorded over the Eastern Front, at least seven were Il-2 Sturmovik ground-attack aircraft.

Born in Gotha, where he was educated at the Ernestine Gymnasium, in 1934 Hahn volunteered for military service in the Wehrmacht of the Third Reich. Initially serving in the Heer (Army), he transferred to the Luftwaffe (Air Force) in late 1935. Following flight training, he was posted to Jagdgeschwader 134 "Horst Wessel" (JG 134—134th Fighter Wing) in April 1936. In November 1937, Hahn was posted as a flight instructor to the Jagdfliegerschule (fighter flying school) at Werneuchen. On 1 February 1939, he was transferred to the Stabstaffel of I. Gruppe (1st group) of Jagdgeschwader 3 (JG 3—3rd Fighter Wing), based at Merseburg. Hahn transferred to Jagdgeschwader 2 (JG 2—2nd Fighter Wing) "Richthofen" on 11 October 1939 and on 15 December, he was appointed Staffelkapitän  (squadron leader) of 4. Staffel of JG 2 "Richthofen". There he claimed his first victory on 14 May 1940, during the Battle of France, over a Royal Air Force Hawker Hurricane fighter. He claimed five victories during the French campaign and further victories during the Battle of Britain which led to the presentation of the Knight's Cross of the Iron Cross on 20 September 1940. On 29 October 1940, Hahn took command of III. Gruppe of JG 2 "Richthofen" as Gruppenkommandeur  (group commander). Following his 41st aerial victory he was awarded the Knight's Cross of the Iron Cross with Oak Leaves on 14 August 1941. Legally, it was Germany's highest military decoration at the time of its presentation to Hahn. On 16 September 1942, Hahn claimed his 66th and last victory on the Western Front. Hahn was then appointed Gruppenkommandeur of II. Gruppe of Jagdgeschwader 54 (JG 54—54th Fighter Wing) operating on the Eastern Front. Over the next three months, he claimed 42 further victories, which included his 100th on 27 January 1943.

On 21 February 1943, Hahn made a forced landing following combat with Soviet fighters and was taken prisoner of war. He remained in captivity until late 1950. Following his release, Hahn wrote his memoirs "I Speak the Truth" recounted his detailed life in Soviet captivity. He then became a successful businessman before retiring in 1977 to the south of France. He died of cancer on 18 December 1982 in Munich.

Early life and career
Hahn was born on 14 April 1914 in Gotha, at the time in Saxe-Coburg and Gotha, present-day in Thuringia. His parents were Arthur, a Finanzrat (Fiscal Council), and his mother Helene. He also had an older sister named Käte. A talented athlete, he was selected to participate in the 1936 Summer Olympics in Berlin in the Pentathlon, but he had to withdraw due to illness. His friends initially nicknamed him "Hansi", a diminutive of his first name Hans, which over time was abbreviated and altered to "Assi".

Hahn enlisted in the Reichswehr on 1 April 1934, as a Fahnenjunker (officer candidate) in 14. (Badisches) Infanterie-Regiment (14th Infantry Regiment). On 1 December 1934, he was promoted to Unteroffizier (corporal). From January to October 1935 he attended the Kriegsschule (war college) in Munich and was promoted to Oberfähnrich (master sergeant) on 1 October 1935. In November 1935, Hahn transferred to the Luftwaffe, and underwent flight training at Celle. He was promoted to Leutnant (second lieutenant) on 1 April 1936. On 15 April 1936, Hahn was posted to 4. Staffel (4th squadron) of Jagdgeschwader 134 "Horst Wessel" (JG 134—134th Fighter Wing), named after the martyr of the Nazi movement Horst Wessel. The unit was based at Werl near Dortmund. There he flew the Arado Ar 65, Ar 68 and the then new Messerschmitt Bf 109, first the B later the D-1 variant. This assignment ended on 31 October 1937.

From 1 November 1937 to 1 April 1938, Hahn served as a flight instructor and Staffelführer (flight leader) of 1. Staffel in the newly created Jagdfliegerschule (fighter flying school) at Werneuchen. Acknowledging his leadership skill, he was promoted to Oberleutnant (first lieutenant) on 1 February 1939. He was then transferred to the Stabstaffel of I. Gruppe (1st group) of Jagdgeschwader 3 (JG 3—3rd Fighter Wing), based at Merseburg. There Hahn introduced his personal emblem of a rooster's head. Hahn in German literally translates in English to rooster.

On 11 October 1939, II. Gruppe of Jagdgeschwader 2 "Richthofen" (JG 2—2nd Fighter Wing), named after the World War I fighter ace Manfred von Richthofen, was formed from elements of I. Gruppe of JG 2 "Richthofen" and I. Gruppe of JG 3, at Zerbst. Hahn was appointed Staffelkapitän  (squadron leader) of 4. Staffel of JG 2 "Richthofen" on 15 December 1939.

World War II
World War II in Europe began on Friday, 1 September 1939, when German forces invaded Poland. In February 1940, II. Gruppe of JG 2 "Richthofen" relocated to Nordholz. Following the start of the Battle of France on 10 May, the Gruppe moved to Münster and then to airfields in Belgium. Hahn claimed his first victory on 14 May 1940 over a Royal Air Force (RAF) Hawker Hurricane fighter.

Hahn would claim five victories during the Battle of France, before becoming even more successful in the Battle of Britain. After 20 claims by September 1940, Hahn was awarded the Knight's Cross of the Iron Cross, promoted to the rank of Hauptmann and Gruppenkommandeur (group commander) of III./JG 2. Hauptmann Hahn was awarded the Knight's Cross of the Iron Cross with Oak Leaves in August 1941 for 41 victories. The presentation was made on 27 August 1941 by Hitler at the Führer Headquarter Wolfsschanze in Rastenburg (now Kętrzyn in Poland). Also present at the award ceremony were the fighter pilots Oberleutnant Hans Philipp and Oberleutnant Heinz Bär who were also awarded the Oak Leaves to the Knight's Cross.

Hahn became an "ace-in-a-day" for the first time on 6 May 1942, claiming five Spitfires shot down for aerial victories 61–65. During one dogfight he and his British opponent ran out of ammunition at the same time. They then looked at each other, laughed and threw their hands up.

Hahn claimed a Supermarine Spitfire on 16 September 1942 to record his 66th claim over the Western Front. Two Spitfires were lost that day; one was shot down by Jagdgeschwader 26 "Schlageter" (JG 26) near Le Treport, while Spitfire Vb AB859 from No. 122 Squadron, piloted by Sgt G. Nadan crashed, owing to unknown reasons.

Hahn was then appointed Gruppenkommandeur of II./Jagdgeschwader 54 Grünherz (JG 54), based near Leningrad on the Eastern Front, on 1 November 1942. In three months he claimed a further 42 Soviet kills. Hahn claimed his 100th victory on 26 January 1943. He was the 34th Luftwaffe pilot to achieve the century mark.

Prisoner of war
Hahn documented his experiences as a prisoner of war upon his return in his narrative "I Speak the Truth". The book begins with his last combat mission flown on 21 February 1943, and ends with his return in late 1949. According to his own account, on Sunday 21 February 1943, Hahn intended to fly to Riga for a meeting with the Luftflotte 1 (1st Air Fleet) commanding staff. Since he had not planned to fly operationally, he did not wear his regular combat dress and did not carry a sidearm that day. On his way to his aircraft, he ran into his wingman, Max Stotz, who informed him that the Heer (German Army) had just requested fighter support over the Demyansk combat area.

On 21 February 1943, Hahn encountered fighters near Staraya, Russa. He shot down a Lavochkin La-5 fighter for his 108th victory before his aircraft received hits in the left wing. Disengaging from  combat, Hahn's engine soon began overheating and he force-landed his Bf 109 G-2/R6 in enemy territory. Soviet sources claim Hahn was shot down by Soviet ace Leytenant Pavel Grazhdaninov (13 victories) of 169 IAP (169th Fighter Aviation Regiment).

Hahn was captured and subsequently made a prisoner of war. Hahn's recalcitrant and forceful personality even in the harsh Soviet regime of a prison camp meant he was held captive by the Soviet Union until 1950.

Later life
Hahn was released as a prisoner of war shortly before Christmas 1950. Among others, he was welcomed by his son but learned that his first wife had left him for another man. He worked at the International Corporation of Bayer Leverkusen and later became a director of Wano Schwarzpulver Company, which manufactured gunpowder, at Kunigunde near Goslar. In 1971, he married Gisela von Vietinghoff, daughter of the former Generaloberst Heinrich von Vietinghoff. Hahn retired in 1977 and lived in southern France. He died of cancer on 18 December 1982 in Munich and was buried in Tirol, Austria with his lifelong friend Julius Meimberg speaking at the memorial service.

Summary of career

Aerial victory claims
According to Spick, Hahn was credited with 108 aerial victories claimed in 560 combat missions. This figure includes 20 aerial victories during the Battle of France and Britain, further 48 aerial victories over the Western Front and 40 more on the Eastern Front. Mathews and Foreman, authors of Luftwaffe Aces — Biographies and Victory Claims, researched the German Federal Archives and found records for 105 aerial victory claims, plus five further unconfirmed claims. This figure includes 43 aerial victories on the Eastern Front and 62 over the Western Allies.

Victory claims were logged to a map-reference (PQ = Planquadrat), for example "PQ 05 Ost 1151". These sectors were then subdivided into 36 smaller units to give a location area 3 × 4 km in size.

Awards
 Iron Cross (1939)
 2nd Class (30 May 1940)
 1st Class (13 June 1940)
 Front Flying Clasp of the Luftwaffe in Gold (26 April 1941)
 German Cross in Gold on 16 July 1942 as Hauptmann in the III./Jagdgeschwader 2
 Knight's Cross of the Iron Cross with Oak Leaves
 Knight's Cross on 24 September 1940 as Oberleutnant and pilot in the 4./Jagdgeschwader 2 "Richthofen"
 32nd Oak Leaves on 14 August 1941 as Hauptmann and Gruppenkommandeur of the III./Jagdgeschwader 2 "Richthofen"

Dates of rank

Works

Notes

References

Citations

Bibliography

 
 
 
 
 
 
 
 
 
 
 
 
 
 
 
 
 
 
 
 

1914 births
1982 deaths
People from Gotha (town)
Luftwaffe pilots
German World War II flying aces
Recipients of the Gold German Cross
Recipients of the Knight's Cross of the Iron Cross with Oak Leaves
German prisoners of war in World War II held by the Soviet Union
Deaths from cancer in Germany
Reichswehr personnel
Military personnel from Thuringia